In computer science, a shadow heap is a mergeable heap data structure which supports efficient heap merging in the amortized sense. More specifically, shadow heaps make use of the shadow merge algorithm to achieve insertion in O(f(n)) amortized time and deletion in O((log n log log n)/f(n)) amortized time, for any choice of 1 ≤ f(n) ≤ log log n.

Throughout this article, it is assumed that A and B are binary heaps with |A| ≤ |B|.

Shadow merge
Shadow merge is an algorithm for merging two binary heaps efficiently if these heaps are implemented as arrays.

Algorithm

The algorithm is as follows:

 Concatenate the array  at the end of the array  to obtain an array .
 Identify the following two parts of the shadow from :
 The subtree : the remainder of the shadow.
 Extract and sort the smallest  nodes from the shadow into an array .
 Transform  as follows:
 If , then starting from the smallest element in the sorted array, sequentially insert each element of  into , replacing them with 's smallest elements.

Running time

Again, let  denote the path, and  denote the subtree of the concatenated heap .

Finally, making a heap of the subtree  takes  time.

Structure

A shadow heap  consists of threshold function , and an array for which the usual array-implemented binary heap property is upheld in its first entries, and for which the heap property is not necessarily upheld in the other entries. Thus, the shadow heap is essentially a binary heap  adjacent to an array . To add an element to the shadow heap, place it in the array . If the array becomes too large according to the specified threshold, we first build a heap out of  using Floyd's algorithm for heap construction, and then merge this heap with  using shadow merge. Finally, the merging of shadow heaps is simply done through sequential insertion of one heap into the other using the above insertion procedure.

Analysis

We are given a shadow heap , with threshold function  as above. We derive the desired running time bounds for the mergeable heap operations using the potential method for amortized analysis. The potential  of the heap is chosen to be:

Using this potential, we can obtain the desired amortized running times:

create(H): initializes a new empty shadow heap 

insert(x, H): inserts  into the shadow heap 
There are two cases:
If the merge is not done, then the amortized cost is 
By choice of the threshold function, we thus obtain that the amortized cost of insertion is:

delete_min(H): deletes the minimum priority element from 
Finding and deleting the minimum takes actual time . Moreover, the potential function can only increase after this deletion if the value of  decreases.

Related algorithms & data structures

Alternatively, the heaps can simply be merged by sequentially inserting each element of  into , taking time .

Sack and Strothotte proposed an algorithm for merging the binary heaps in  time. Their algorithm is known to be more efficient than the second naive solution described above roughly when . Shadow merge performs asymptotically better than their algorithm, even in the worst case.

There are several other heaps which support faster merge times. For instance, Fibonacci heaps can be merged in  time. Since binary heaps require  time to merge, shadow merge remains efficient.

References

Heaps (data structures)
Amortized data structures